Charles Ernest Beulé (29 June 1826 – 4 April 1874) was a French archaeologist and politician.

Biography
Born at Saumur, Maine-et-Loire, he was educated at the École Normale, and after having held the professorship of rhetoric at Moulins for a year, was sent to Athens in 1851 as one of the professors in the École Française there.

While in Athens, he discovered the Beulé Gate leading to the propylaea of the acropolis, and his work, L'Acropole d'Athènes was published by order of the minister of public instruction. On his return to France, promotion and distinctions followed rapidly upon his first successes. He was made doctor of letters, chevalier of the Légion d'honneur, professor of archaeology at the Bibliothèque Impériale, member of the Académie des Inscriptions et Belles-Lettres, and perpetual secretary of the Académie des Beaux-Arts.

He took great interest in political affairs, with which the last few years of his life were entirely occupied. Elected a member of the National Assembly in 1871, he zealously supported the Orleanist party. Between May and November 1873 he was Minister of the Interior in the Broglie ministry.

He committed suicide on 4 April 1874, aged 47.

Works

Beulé was also the author of high-class popular works on artistic and historical subjects: Histoire de l'art grec avant Pericles, the second edition of which was published in 1870, and  published in four parts between 1867 and 1870.

References

Attribution:

1826 births
1874 deaths
People from Saumur
Politicians from Pays de la Loire
Orléanists
French interior ministers
Members of the National Assembly (1871)
French archaeologists
French numismatists
Members of the Académie des Inscriptions et Belles-Lettres
French politicians who committed suicide
Burials at Père Lachaise Cemetery
1870s suicides